Ruin (also Romanized as Rū’īn) is a village in Ruin Rural District, in the Central District of Esfarayen County, North Khorasan Province, Iran. At the 2006 census, its population was 2,604, in 783 families.

The dominant language in the village is Tati.

References 

Populated places in Esfarayen County